The Iran national rugby union team is a sporting side that represents Iran in rugby union and is controlled by the I.R. Iran Rugby Federation. The I.R. Iran Rugby Federation is a member of World Rugby and the Asian Rugby Football Union (ARFU).

The team currently competes in Division 3 (West) of the Asian Rugby Championship.

History 

On August 18, 2007, Iran played its first international friendly as part of the Pakistan Tour and won 22–11 in Lahore, Pakistan.

Results summary
Their test match record against all nations (listed alphabetically), updated to April 19, 2016, is as follows:

Honours
 2007 IRB Singer Rugby Asiad Shield Championship
 2008 Asian Five Nations Central Asia Regional tournament Champions
 2010 Asian Five Nations Division III tournament Champions
 2013 West Asia Championship in Dubai

Coaches
  Sadegh Nabidoust (2007)
  Emil Vartazarian (2007)
  Rob Yule (2008–2009)
  Sadegh Nabidoust (2010)
  Wayne Marsters (2010–2011)
  Sadegh Nabidoust (2011)
  Mahyar Askari (2012)
  Pedram Baniamerian (2013)
  Liam Dunseath (2016)
  Mahyar Askari 2019–present

See also
Rugby union in Iran

Notes

External links
 I.R. Iran Rugby Federation
 Iran on WorldRugby.com
 Iran on RugbyData.com

Asian national rugby union teams
Rugby union
Rugby union in Iran